Michael Lambert Igoe (April 16, 1885 – August 21, 1967) was an American politician who served as a United States representative from Illinois, an Illinois state representative, a United States District Attorney for the Northern District of Illinois, and a United States district judge of the Northern District of Illinois.

Education and career

Born in Saint Paul, Minnesota, Igoe was educated in the parochial schools and De La Salle Institute in Chicago, Illinois. He received a Bachelor of Laws from Georgetown Law in Washington, D.C. in 1908. He was admitted to the bar the same year and commenced practice in Chicago from 1908 to 1939. He was Chief Assistant United States Attorney of the Northern District of Illinois from 1915 to 1917. He was a member of the board of South Park Commissioners from 1924 to 1932.

Political career
Igoe was a member of the Illinois House of Representatives from 1913 to 1930. He was a delegate to the Democratic National Convention in 1928 and a member of the Democratic National Committee from 1930 to 1932.

Igoe sought the Democratic nomination for Governor of Illinois in 1932, but was defeated by Henry Horner.

In 1920 he ran for Cook County State's Attorney, winning the Democratic primary against incumbent Maclay Hoyne, but losing the general election to Republican nominee Robert E. Crowe.

He was elected as a Democrat to the United States House of Representatives of the 74th United States Congress, serving from January 3, 1935, until his resignation effective June 2, 1935, to take the post of United States Attorney for the Northern District of Illinois, serving from 1935 to 1939.

He ran unsuccessfully in the Democratic primary of the 1938 United States Senate election in Illinois.

Federal judicial service

Igoe received a recess appointment from President Franklin D. Roosevelt on November 21, 1938, to the United States District Court for the Northern District of Illinois, to a new seat authorized by 52 Stat. 584. He was nominated to the same position by President Roosevelt on January 5, 1939. He was confirmed by the United States Senate on February 9, 1939, and received his commission on March 4, 1939. He assumed senior status on August 31, 1965. His service terminated on August 21, 1967, due to his death in Chicago. He was interred in All Saints Cemetery in Des Plaines, Illinois.

See also
List of federal judges appointed by Franklin D. Roosevelt

References

Sources
 
 

1885 births
1967 deaths
De La Salle Institute alumni
Politicians from Chicago
Politicians from Saint Paul, Minnesota
Democratic Party members of the Illinois House of Representatives
Judges of the United States District Court for the Northern District of Illinois
United States district court judges appointed by Franklin D. Roosevelt
20th-century American judges
Georgetown University Law Center alumni
Democratic Party members of the United States House of Representatives from Illinois
United States Attorneys for the Northern District of Illinois
Assistant United States Attorneys